Scopula africana is a moth of the family Geometridae. It is endemic to Somalia.

References

Moths described in 1937
africana
Endemic fauna of Somalia
Moths of Africa